Kao Chin Su-mei (born September 21, 1965), also known as Chin Su-mei, May Chin and Ciwas Ali, is a Taiwanese politician and retired actress and singer. She is of Manchu and Atayal descent, Ciwas Ali being her Atayal name.

In the 1980s and 1990s, she starred in many popular TV series and films including Ang Lee's The Wedding Banquet (1993). She also released several Mandopop albums. She retired from showbiz in 1999 following her diagnosis of liver cancer which she recovered from.

Chin was elected into the Legislative Yuan of the Republic of China (Taiwan) in December 2001, and re-elected in 2004, 2008, 2012, 2016 and 2020,  all in the Highland Aborigines electoral district. Representing the Non-Partisan Solidarity Union, she is currently the only party member in the Legislative Yuan, and a strong advocate of aboriginal rights. She is also associated with the Pan-Blue Coalition

Early life
Chin Su-mei was born in Heping Township, Taichung County (present day part of Taichung City), Taiwan. Her father was an ethnic Manchu from mainland China. In the mid-1980s, she stood for election to be a representative of Taiwanese Aborigines within the Legislative Yuan of the Republic of China (Taiwan), during which she took on the Chinese surname of her Taiwanese Aborigine mother, hence becoming Kao Chin Su-mei. Her Ayatal name is Ciwas Ali and May Chin remains her stage name.

Chin also published at least 8 Mandopop albums and showed up in various local commercials. Besides acting, in mid-1990s May Chin ran a wedding photography service shop in Taipei. However this shop burned down in 1996 and the fire claimed six lives.

Political career
Since entering the Legislative Yuan after elected in the 2001 Republic of China legislative election, Chin has been noted for her outspoken views, traditional Atayal costume and face paint in the shape of traditional Atayal tattoo work reserved for married women.

On 19 August 2009, Chin met with the General Secretary of the Chinese Communist Party, Hu Jintao. At the meeting, General Secretary Hu expressed his deep sorrow and condolences for the typhoon victims in Taiwan to an actor-turned-politician Kao who led a delegation of her fellow ethnic minorities in Taiwan to visit the mainland. Hu added that "People on both sides of the Taiwan Strait are of one family and Chinese people have a long tradition of lending a hand to those in danger and difficulties."

Personal life
Chin was never married. She was once in a relationship with Hong Kong actor Kenny Ho whom she first met on the set of the Taiwanese drama Endless Love in 1989. They later separated in 1993, and still remain good friends. Chin and Ho agreed that if they are still single by the age of 60, they would spend the rest of their lives together.

In 2006, it was reported by the Taiwanese media Next Magazine that she had a long and lasting extramarital affair with the Minister of the Interior Lee Hong-yuan between mid-2000s and early 2010s.

In 2011 she entered into a relationship with a renowned Taiwanese journalist and writer Xu Zhiyuan. They later broke up in 2013 but still remain good friends.

Filmography

Films

Television

Electoral history

References

External links

Personal Blog (in Traditional Chinese)
Washing away vanity, Taiwan's Aborigines

1965 births
Living people
Aisin Gioro
Aboriginal Members of the Legislative Yuan
Anti-Japanese sentiment in Taiwan
Atayal people
Members of the 5th Legislative Yuan
Members of the 6th Legislative Yuan
Members of the 7th Legislative Yuan
Members of the 8th Legislative Yuan
Members of the 9th Legislative Yuan
Minzu University of China alumni
Non-Partisan Solidarity Union Members of the Legislative Yuan
Politicians of the Republic of China on Taiwan from Taichung
Taiwanese actor-politicians
Taiwanese women singers
Taiwanese film actresses
Taiwanese people of Manchu descent
21st-century Taiwanese women politicians
Actresses from Taichung
Musicians from Taichung
Members of the 10th Legislative Yuan
Manchu actresses
Manchu singers